Lysiosepalum abollatum, also known as woolly lysiosepalum, is a species of flowering plant in the mallow family that is endemic to Australia.

Description
The species grows as a dense, erect shrub up to 1.5 m in height. The small, narrow leaves are hairy on both sides. The inflorescences are 40–90 mm long, with up to eight flowers which appear from August to September. The flowers have dark pink petals surrounded by a mauve to pink calyx.

Distribution and habitat
The plants have a very restricted natural range; they are found only in the Wongan Hills area of the Avon Wheatbelt IBRA bioregion, some 180 km north-east of Perth, in south-west Western Australia. They grow in open mallee-heath on orange-brown, sandy clay, lateritic soils on the lower slopes and at the bases of hills. Associated vegetation includes Eucalyptus ebbanoensis, Acacia pharangites and A. congesta over an understorey of Halgania, Allocasuarina, Leptospermum and Hibbertia species.

Conservation
The species has been listed as Critically Endangered under Australia's EPBC Act. The main threats are land clearing for agriculture, soil erosion, and grazing by rabbits and kangaroos.

References

abollatum
Rosids of Western Australia
Malvales of Australia
Taxa named by Carolyn F. Wilkins
Plants described in 2001